Two Brothers may refer to:

Films

 Two Brothers (1929 film), a 1929 German silent film, directed by Mikhail Dubson
 Two Brothers (2004 film), a 2004 French-British film, directed by Jean-Jacques Annaud
 The Two Brothers (film), a 1910 American short Western film, directed by D. W. Griffith

Music
 "The Twa Brothers", a traditional ballad
 Two Brothers (album), a 2001 album by Boxhead Ensemble

Literature and folklore
Tale of Two Brothers, an ancient Egyptian story 
The Two Brothers, a German fairy tale
 The Two Brothers, one of the  English titles of Honoré de Balzac's novel La Rabouilleuse
Dois Irmãos ("Two Brothers"), a 2000 novel by the Brazilian author Milton Hatoum

Video games 

 Two Brothers (video game), a 2013 action role-playing video game

Other
Two Brothers (ship), a nineteenth century Nantucket whaleship
Two Brothers, U.S. Virgin Islands, a settlement on the island of Saint Croix
Two Brothers Roundhouse, on the former Chicago & Aurora Railroad